The 2011 Melbourne Football Club season was the club's 112th year in the VFL/AFL since it began in 1897.

In January, the club announced Brad Green as captain, taking over the reins from the recently retired James McDonald. Aaron Davey, Brent Moloney and Jared Rivers were named vice captains while youngsters Nathan Jones and Jack Grimes were promoted to the leadership group.

2011 list changes

2010 trades

Retirements and delistings

National draft

Rookie draft

2011 squad

2011 season

Pre-season

NAB Cup

Week 1

Quarter-final

NAB Challenge

Week 3

Week 4

Home and away season

Round 1

Round 2

Round 3

Round 4

Round 5

Round 6

Round 7

Round 8

Round 9

Round 10

Round 11

Round 12

Round 13

Round 14

Round 15

Round 16

Round 17

Round 18

Round 19

Round 20

Round 21

Round 22

Round 23

Round 24

Ladder

Awards and milestones

References

External links
Official Website of the Melbourne Football Club
Official Website of the Australian Football League

2011
Melbourne Football Club